Metaxmeste sericatalis is a species of moth in the family Crambidae. It is found in Turkey.

References

Moths described in 1848
Odontiini
Endemic fauna of Turkey